The following lists events that happened during 1987 in South Africa.

Incumbents
 State President: P.W. Botha.
Chief Justice: Pieter Jacobus Rabie.

Events
January
 1 – South African Defence Force servicemen are attacked in Alexandra, Johannesburg and at least one is injured.
 3 – Three people are injured when a limpet mine explodes at the corner of Jeppe and Delvers Streets in Johannesburg.
 8 – At the AECI plant, a police officer is shot at and in the skirmish that follows, two policemen and one civilian are injured.
 9 – A bomb explodes at the OK Bazaars, a national supermarket chain, in Eloff Street, Johannesburg during a protracted strike.
 9 – A riot squad policeman is killed and two injured when a grenade is thrown into their vehicle.
 9 – Police raid English-language newspapers, seizing documents related to an advertisement calling for the legalising of the African National Congress.
 20 – The Margo Commission, which is set up to investigate the air disaster in which Samora Machel, Mozambiqian President, was killed, commences.
 21 – Twelve people are killed, including seven children, in KwaMakutha near Amanzimtoti, when the home of the United Democratic Front activist Bheki Ntuli is attacked by a group of men armed with AK-47 rifles.
 23 – Two cadres/terrorists are killed in Soweto.
 24 – One Transkei soldier or police officer is injured in an Umkhonto we Sizwe attack in Mendu, Willowvale.
 30 – Three soldiers and one police officer are killed in an attack in Alexandra, Johannesburg.
 31 – The home of town councillor Senokoane in Diepmeadow, Soweto is attacked and six people are injured, including two police officers.

February
 2 – The single quarters of the Bokomo Police Station is attacked twice with grenades and one policeman is injured.
 5 – An Explosion at a bus shelter outside the Groote Schuur Hospital injures one person.
 18 – A number of people are killed in a grenade attack on Tladi Secondary School.
 19 – Chief Lushaba and Samuel Jamile of the Inkatha Freedom Party are injured when a grenade is thrown at them.
 A limpet mine explosion causes damage to a shop in Matatiele.

March
 3 – A cadre/terrorist is shot and killed by police in Gugulethu after he fired on their patrol with an AK-47.
 9 – One police officer and two municipal police officers are killed in Gugulethu. One cadre//terrorists is also possibly killed but this is unconfirmed.
 11 – Police confirms a skirmish at Zone 13 Mdantsane in Ciskei, but gives no details.
 11 – A cadre/terrorist is shot and killed in a house in New Crossroads.
 12 – Sweden announces a total boycott on trade with South Africa, effective from October.
 13 – Four municipal police officers are killed and one injured in Atteridgeville.
 16 – A grenade is thrown at the home of a police officer in Kagiso but causes no injuries.
 17 – During a police raid in Inanda, a cadre and a woman are killed. Another man and a baby are injured in the raid.
 17 – Three explosions damage the railway line between Newcastle and Johannesburg.
 28 – An anti-tank landmine kills four people and injures one in the Josefsdal area near the Swaziland border.

April
 1 – Three soldiers are killed and two injured when a grenade is thrown into their Hippo armoured personnel carrier in either Mabopane or Mamelodi.
 1 – A grenade is thrown at the home of Councillor Radebe in Dobsonville, with no injuries.
 2 – Three policemen are injured in Nyanga when a grenade is thrown at them.
 8 – Two cadres/terrorists and a police officer are killed in a shootout at Ventersdorp.
 9 – Three police officers come under attack in Meadowlands Zone 10.
 10 – Ciskei, South Africa and Transkei sign a security pact in Cape Town, prohibiting cross-border violence between the three states.
 14 – The home of a police officer in Chesterfield, Durban, comes under grenade attack with no injuries.
 15 – A special branch police officer is killed by a sniper and another injured south of Durban in Umbumbulu.
 16 – An explosion in the parking area of a Newcastle supermarket injures two people.
 20 – A grenade is thrown at group of soldiers at the Dube train station in Soweto. No casualties are reported.
 23 – The home of a police officer in Bonteheuwel comes under grenade attack.
 24 – During a riot police raid in Umlazi, Durban, two cadres/terrorists are killed and three riot police officers are injured.
 24 – Police invade the UCT campus in an unprecedented show of force.
 30 – Four police officers are injured in a grenade attack on their barracks in Osizweni, Newcastle.

May
 5 – Two people are killed and twenty injured in a landmine explosion on a road close to Messina near the Zimbabwe border.
 5 – Two mini-limpets explode at the Johannesburg Civic Centre, with no injuries.
 6 – The National Party wins the General Elections. The Conservative Party becomes the official opposition, ousting the Progressive Federal Party.
 9 – A police officer, three soldiers and a cadre are killed in a skirmish in Mamelodi.
 16 – An explosion occurs at Newcastle train station's waiting room and while police are investigating the blast, a second bomb explodes, injuring a police officer.
 19 – An explosion occurs at the Carlton Centre in central Johannesburg.
 20 – Two bombs explode at the Johannesburg magistrate's court. The first minor explosion acts as a decoy and is followed by a second more powerful charge minutes later, which kills three police officers and injure four others and six bystanders.

June
 4 – State President of South Africa Pieter Willem Botha visits Sharpeville.
 11 – During a police raid in Emdeni, Soweto, police are ambushed and a cadre and a police officer are killed.
 12 – Two police officers are found murdered in Witbank.
 12 – A Limpet mine explodes at the Athlone Magistrates Court in Johannesburg.
 15 – The home of a councillor in Gugulethu comes under grenade attack and four people are injured, two of them special constables.
 21 – A police patrol is attacked with grenades and seven police officers are injured.

July
 6 – Umkhonto we Sizwe ambushes the police in Mdantsane. Two police officers are killed and three injured. A cadre/terrorist is also shot and killed.
 6 – A milestone meeting is held in Dakar, Senegal between 52 mainly Afrikaans-speaking intellectuals led by Dr Frederik van Zyl Slabbert and the banned African National Congress led by Thabo Mbeki.
 8 – Police crush a cadre and his sister to death in a shack in Motherwell after they were fired on.
 8 – A limpet mine explodes at 11h12 in the bar of the Village Main Hotel, Johannesburg.
 9 – Mozambique and the Soviet Union reject the findings of the Margo Commission on the air disaster in which Samora Machel, Mozambiqian President, was killed.
 12 – During a police raid in Athlone, Johannesburg, a cadre/terrorist is killed and four arrested.
 18 – A police officer and his wife are injured in attack on their home in Mamelodi East.
 20 – A car bomb explodes outside a block of flats in District Six, Cape Town, with no injuries.
 25 – A grenade is thrown at a home in Pimville but harmlessly explodes outside the house.
 30 – An anti-tank landmine injures three people on the farm Bodena, owned by Danie Hough.
 30 – A car bomb explodes outside the Witwatersrand Command and kills one soldier and injures 68 people.

August
 3 – 23 conscripts publicly announce in Cape Town that they refuse to serve in the SADF.
 5 – A cadre/terrorist is killed in shootout with police on Ntshekisa Road in New Brighton, Port Elizabeth.
 13 – An Emdeni police Sergeant is injured when a grenade is thrown at his vehicle.
 13 – The South African Defence Force launches Operation Moduler.
 23 – A shop in Emdeni, frequented by soldiers, is attacked with grenades.
 24 – A grenade is thrown at a police vehicle in Emdeni. Two police officers and eight bystanders are injured.
 27 – The home of the former Mayor of Soweto, Kunene, is attacked and two council police officers are killed.
 30 – A grenade is thrown at five soldiers outside barracks. An estimated eight SADF members are killed or injured.

September
 2 – Police in Sandton kills a terrorist after he threw a grenade at a roadblock.
 17 – Religious leaders, including Desmond Tutu, hold talks with the African National Congress in Zambia.
 23 – South Africa and Malawi sign an agreement for the training of Malawian nurses in South Africa.
 24 – Ten people, including two police officers, are injured in grenade attack on a police patrol in Soweto.
 28 – Two bombs explode at the Standard Bank arena in Johannesburg.
 The South African Army kills four and captures two terrorists near the Zimbabwe border. After the two cadres are handed over to police, they escape killing two police officers. The army later tracks them down and kills them in a fire-fight.
 The Commander of KwaNdebele National Guard Unit in Marble Hall and his son, a police officer, is shot and killed by AK-47 fire.

October
 1 – A bomb placed outside the door of Amichand Rajbansi's NPP office in Lenasia explodes hours after official opening, with no injuries.
 28 – Near the Swaziland border a soldier is killed and a terrorist wounded in a skirmish.

November
 5 – Govan Mbeki is released from custody of Apartheid government after serving 24 years in the Robben Island prison.
 6 – A special constable and two civilians are killed by sniper fire in Khayelitsha.
 12 – Two limpet mines explode and a third one is safely detonated by police at the Zola Municipal offices in Soweto.
 14 – During a South African Defence Force commemoration march in Cape Town, a limpet mine explodes in a bin, injuring a soldier.
 18 – A Limpet mine is found and defused at the Johannesburg post office.
 23 – During a police raid on a house in Umlazi, Durban two guerillas and an alleged collaborator are killed. Two police officers are injured in the raid.
 28 – South African Airways Flight 295 crashes into the Indian Ocean near Mauritius due to a fire in the cargo hold, killing 159 passengers and crew.
 30 – Three explosions occur at the Dube municipal training centre in Soweto, with no injuries.

December
 10 – During a police raid on a shack in the Port Elizabeth area, they meet heavy resistance from the residents. The police drive a Casspir over the shack, killing four.
 12 – A group of police officers are fired upon by cadres//terrorists from a moving car in Soweto. Two police officers are killed and four injured.

Unknown date
 Bulelani Ngcuka joins the United Democratic Front in the Western Cape.

Births
 6 January – Bongani Khumalo, footballer
 21 January – Shaun Keeling, olympics silver medalist rower
 6 February – Kyle Brown (rugby union), olympics bronze medallist & South African Sevens team player
 6 March – Bobby van Jaarsveld, Afrikaans-language singer
 23 March – Stacey Doubell, badminton player
 26 March – Philip Snyman, captain of the South Africa national rugby sevens team & olympics bronze medallist
 5 May – Matthew Brittain, olympics gold medalist rower
 13 May – Sifiso Nhlapo, racing cyclist
 14 May – François Steyn, Springbok rugby player
 19 May – Connell Cruise, singer-songwriter
 9 June – Roxy Louw, surfer, model and actress
 18 June – Ayanda Jiya, singer, songwriter and record producer
 20 June – Itumeleng Khune, South Africa national football team captain
 25 June – Bonang Matheba,  tv presenter, radio personality, businesswoman
 5 July – Irvette van Zyl, long-distance runner
 20 July – Riky Rick, rapper, songwriter and actor
 10 September – Kelli Shean, golfer
 9 October – Stephanie Sandler, rhythmic gymnast
 20 October – Anele Ngcongca, football player
 15 November – DJ Maphorisa, record producer and DJ
 13 December – Thabo Matlaba, football player
 29 December – Pearl Modiadie,  tv presenter, radio DJ, actress and producer

Deaths

Railways

Locomotives
 The South African Railways places the first of fifty Class 10E1, Series 1 electric locomotives in mainline service.

Sports

Athletics
 2 May – Zithulele Sinqe wins his second national title in the men's marathon, clocking 2:10:51 in Stellenbosch.

References

South Africa
Years in South Africa
History of South Africa